Shiraki Dam is an earthfill dam located in Fukuoka Prefecture in Japan. The dam is used for water supply. The catchment area of the dam is 2.5 km2. The dam impounds about 3  ha of land when full and can store 380 thousand cubic meters of water. The construction of the dam was completed in 1934.

References

Dams in Fukuoka Prefecture
1934 establishments in Japan